Andreyevskoye is a rural locality (a selo) in Krasnoselskoye Rural Settlement, Yuryev-Polsky District, Vladimir Oblast, Russia. The population was 4 as of 2010.

Geography 
It is located on the Sega River, 8 km south-west from Yuryev-Polsky.

References 

Rural localities in Yuryev-Polsky District